Little John's Well is a water well situated near to the A638 at Hampole, in the Metropolitan Borough of Doncaster, in what was known as Barnsdale Forest.

See also
Little John
Robin Hood
Robin Hood's Well

References

External links
Little John's Well, Hampole

Buildings and structures in the Metropolitan Borough of Doncaster
Water wells in England